During the 2005–06 English football season, Derby County competed in the Football League Championship.

Season summary
Derby County had high hopes going into the season after finishing fourth the previous season, but manager George Burley, who had transformed Derby from relegation candidates into promotion hopefuls, quit in June following the sale of young midfielder Tom Huddlestone to Tottenham Hotspur, without Burley's knowledge nor consent. His replacement, Phil Brown (in his first full-time managerial position) was unable to build on Burley's good work and their poor form dragged them into the relegation mire instead. He was sacked in January after a 6–1 thrashing against Coventry City in the league and a 3–1 defeat against League One side Colchester United in the FA Cup, with Derby languishing in 19th. Former coach Terry Westley stepped up as caretaker manager; despite no wins in his first five games, he was named as caretaker manager for the remainder of the season - Westley promptly won his first game two days later, 1–0 at home to Plymouth. Westley marginally improved Derby's form and they managed to confirm their Championship survival with a few games of the season to spare. Westley, however, was not offered the role of permanent manager; that went to former Preston North End boss Billy Davies.

Derby's form was especially poor away from home, with only 2 away wins all season, a complete contrast from the previous season from which they won 12 away games including six in a row.

Kit
Derby changed both their kit manufacturer and sponsor this season, with Spanish company Joma producing the kits and the Derbyshire Building Society sponsoring the kits.

Final league table

Players

First-team squad
Squad at end of season

Left club during season

Reserve squad

Statistics

Starting 11
These charts below depict the most used starters in the most used starting formation. The most recent starters/formations are listed when total starts are equal between two players/formations.

References

Notes

2005-06
Derby County